Brian Groombridge (born December 18, 1953) is a Canadian visual artist. He currently lives and works in Toronto, Ontario.

Biography 

Groombridge was born in Sarnia, Ontario in 1953. He attended Sheridan College in 1972, and continued at the Ontario College of Art (O.C.A., now OCAD University) from 1974 to 1978. In 1977 he became part of O.C.A.'s New York Off-Campus Study Program. Groombridge works in various media including screen-print, letterpress and sculpture. His work has been presented across Canada and abroad at venues including Het Apollohuis, Eindhoven, Netherlands; Cold City Gallery, Toronto; Contemporary Art Gallery, Vancouver; Art Gallery of Ontario, Toronto; National Gallery of Canada, Ottawa; Art Gallery of Nova Scotia, Halifax; Plug In ICA, Winnipeg; and The Power Plant, Toronto. His work has been collected by various public institutions including Art Gallery of Hamilton; Art Gallery of Nova Scotia; Art Gallery of Ontario; Museum London; National Gallery of Canada; Vancouver Art Gallery; and numerous private collections.

Art Practice 

Brian Groombridge's internationally exhibited work is characterized by a reductive, minimalist style with subject matter inspired by historical sources such as facts, data and measurements that usually pertain to the art world. As Jen Hutton writes in her 2013 essay Galileo's Finger, "[Groombridge's] sculptures, installations, and wall works employ a strict rationality: hard edges, cool metals, and bright, smooth finishes. If there is decoration, it is austere. If there is text, it is extremely concise or merely a label."
Groombridge's work often refers to the transient nature of things, and plays with the idea of fluctuation by presenting meaning and perception as flexible, not fixed. In a 2008 Globe and Mail article by Gary Michael Dault, Groombridge is quoted as saying ""I love the arrested moment. Meaning that moment when just to look at something stops it in its tracks—like slicing one frame from a film." Groombridge's work combines poetic and literal elements to comment on select moments of history and life that are worthy of contemplation and respect.
In his work Groombridge also often refers to systems of knowledge such as measurement, geography and cosmology.  As E. C. Woodley states in a 2013 review in Art in America, "Signs of engagement with the cosmos appear frequently in Brian Groombridge's work, representing a hunger for knowledge beyond ourselves and a faith in such knowledge even if it is minuscule compared with what we don't know."

Further reading 

Dault, Gary Michael. Brian Groombridge, Shirley Wiitasalo at Susan Hobbs. The Globe and Mail, 9 December 2000;

Everett-Green, Robert. Sculpture that knows its place. The Globe and Mail, 30 August 1986;

Genereux, Linda. Brian Groombridge: Toronto Sculpture Garden. Artforum,(October 1990)179;

Grenville, Bruce. The New City of Sculpture. C Magazine, no.3(Fall 1984)78-81;

Herman, Joel. Joel Herman on Brian Groombridge. Framework 11/12, November 2012;

Holubizky, Ihor. Brian Groombridge. Toronto: The Power Plant, 1988;

Johnston, Wayne. Upstairs and Down: Installations. University of Western Ontario Gazette, 15 September 1981;

Mays, John Bentley. Poetic Polarities. The Globe and Mail, 18 July 1990;

Miller, Earl. Focus: Brian Groombridge. Canadian Art, (Summer 1989)87;

Moser, Gabrielle. Site Exercises. ARTnews, October 2010;

Reeve, Charles, and Siobhan Roberts. Brian Groombridge. Toronto: Susan Hobbs Gallery, 2008;

Reeve, Charles. Brian Groombridge. Frieze, March 2013;

Sandals, Leah. Upending Expectations. The National Post, 14 August 2010;

van Peer, René. Uitersten bijeen in Apollohuis. Eindhoven Dagblad, 5 November 1991;

Vartanian, Hrag. The Art of Paper in Montreal. Hyperallergic Blog, April 26, 2013;

Webb, Marshall. A Journey Around the New City of Sculpture. Canadian Art, 1:2(Winter 1984-85)74-75;9

Woodley, E.C. Brian Groombridge: YYZ and Susan Hobbs. Art in America, February 2013;

Woodley, E.C. Brian Groombridge. Border Crossings, Issue 125, March 2013.

References 

Living people
1953 births
Canadian sculptors
Canadian male sculptors
Canadian multimedia artists
People from Sarnia
Artists from Ontario
OCAD University alumni